The Arkansas Department of Finance and Administration (commonly DFA within the state) is a department of the government of Arkansas under the Governor of Arkansas.

The DFA is a cabinet level agency in the executive branch of government responsible for providing citizens with tax, licensure, or child support service and state agencies in their administration and budgeting.

Division of Assessment Coordination

Division of Finance
The Division of Finance is led by the Comptroller of Arkansas.
Office of Accounting
Office of Administrative Services
Office of Economic Analysis and Tax Research
Office of Intergovernmental Services

Division of Management Services
The Division of Finance is led by the Deputy Director/Chief of Staff.
Office of Budget
Office of Accounting
Office of Arkansas Lottery
Office of Child Support Enforcement
Office of Communications
Office of Information Services
Office of State Procurement
Office of Personnel Management

Division of Revenue
The Division of Finance is led by the Commissioner of Revenue.
Office of Driver Services
Office of Excise Tax Administration
Office of Income Tax Administration
Office of Field Audit Administration
Office of Motor Vehicle
Office of State Revenue Office Administration 
Office of Revenue Legal Counsel

Boards and Commissions
In Arkansas's shared services model of state government, the cabinet-level agencies assist boards and commissions who have an overlapping scope. DFA supports:

Boards
Alcohol Beverage Control Board
Arkansas Medical Marijuana Control Board
Lottery Retailer Advisory Board
Tobacco Control Board

Commissions
Arkansas Racing Commission

Councils
Governor's Developmental Disability Council

See also

References

Finance and Administration, Department of
US state tax agencies
Motor vehicle registration agencies